Carlos Henrique Carneiro Marinho or simply Carlinhos (born 23 June 1983), is a Brazilian right back or wing-back.

Career 
Carlinhos was signed by Villa Rio in January 2007 on a four-year deal. He was immediately loaned to Fluminense for two years. Since January 2009 he plays for Náutico and turned back to Villa Rio on 27 April 2009.

Honours
Vitória
Bahia State League: 2003, 2004

Fluminense
Brazilian Cup: 2007

Contract
Villa Rio 4 January 2007 to 31 December 2010

External links
 sambafoot
 CBF
 Guardian Stats Centre
 zerozero.pt
 placar
globo.com 

1983 births
Living people
Brazilian footballers
Esporte Clube Vitória players
Avaí FC players
Villa Rio Esporte Clube players
Fluminense FC players
Clube Náutico Capibaribe players
Association football defenders
People from Maceió
Sportspeople from Alagoas